Sion Jones (born 16 December 1997) is a Welsh professional rugby league footballer who plays as a  for Hunslet R.L.F.C. in the RFL League 1.

Background
Jones was born in Barry, Vale of Glamorgan, Wales.

References

External links
Hunslet profile
Halifax profile
Otley profile
SQUAD UPDATE – BACK ROW
Former Penarth rugby kid joins league big boys

1997 births
Living people
Halifax R.L.F.C. players
Hunslet R.L.F.C. players
Pontypridd RFC players
Rugby league locks
Rugby league players from the Vale of Glamorgan
Rugby league props
Rugby league second-rows
Rugby union players from Barry
Wales national rugby league team players
Welsh rugby league players
Welsh rugby union players